Gabriele Ambrosetti (born 7 August 1973) is an Italian football manager and former player, who played as a winger.

Playing career

Born in Varese, Ambrosetti made his professional debut with his hometown club, and later played for several Italian sides, including Brescia, Venezia, and Vicenza. He won the 1996–97 Coppa Italia at Vicenza, defeating Napoli 3–1 on aggregate in the final, and in April 1998 played in a Cup Winners Cup semi-final against Chelsea, where his performances inspired the English Premier League club to sign him for £3.5 million in August 1999. He arrived as, according to his manager, Gianluca Vialli, the 'Italian Ryan Giggs', but struggled to live up to the tag and in four years made only a handful of appearances. He made his Chelsea debut as a substitute on 21 August in a 1–0 home win against Aston Villa, replacing compatriot Gianfranco Zola for the last three minutes. The only goal he scored for Chelsea was in a 5–0 win against Galatasaray in Istanbul, on 20 October 1999 during the UEFA Champions League Group Stage. Ambrosetti also contributed one appearance to Chelsea's victorious 1999–2000 FA Cup campaign. He spent his final seasons with Piacenza and Pro Patria, before retiring.

Style of play
Capable of playing both as a forward and as a midfielder, Ambrosetti was a quick and technically gifted winger, who was known for his pace, ability to get past players, and his powerful and accurate shot from distance.

Coaching career
In January 2016 Ambrosetti joined the coaching staff of Swansea City under their newly appointed manager Francesco Guidolin, who had previously coached Ambrosetti at Vicenza. When Guidolin was sacked, Ambrosetti also left the club.

Honours
Brescia
Anglo-Italian Cup: 1993–94

Vicenza
Coppa Italia: 1996–97

Chelsea
FA Cup: 1999–2000
FA Community Shield: 2000

References

Brescia Calcio players
Chelsea F.C. players
Italian expatriate footballers
Italian footballers
Living people
Premier League players
Serie A players
Serie B players
Serie C players
L.R. Vicenza players
Piacenza Calcio 1919 players
Aurora Pro Patria 1919 players
Expatriate footballers in England
Italian expatriate sportspeople in England
1973 births
Sportspeople from Varese
Swansea City A.F.C. non-playing staff
Association football midfielders
Footballers from Lombardy